Nguyễn Ngọc Kiều Khanh is a beauty pageant contestant and student. Kiều Khanh was born 1992 in Schwerin, Germany, and is of Vietnamese descent. She also holds Vietnamese citizenship. She is the first runner-up of Miss Vietnam World 2010 pageant in Nha Trang, Vietnam. Kiều Khanh is the official representative of Vietnam in the Miss World 2010 pageant in Sanya, China.

Miss World 2010
Nguyễn Ngọc Kiều Khanh has been named as the representative of Vietnam to the Miss World 2010 pageant.

Kiều Khanh is the first runner-up in Miss Vietnam World 2010 Pageant where she also won the Miss Beach Beauty fast-track competition in Miss Vietnam World 2010. Earlier, Kiều Khanh won the title of Miss Vietnam Europe 2009.

Kieu Khanh is fluent in Vietnamese, English and German.

References

Miss World 2010 delegates
German people of Vietnamese descent
Living people
1992 births
Vietnamese female models
Vietnamese beauty pageant winners